Grimm Reality is a BBC Books original novel written by Simon Bucher-Jones and Kelly Hale and based on the long-running British science fiction television series Doctor Who. It features the Eighth Doctor, Fitz and Anji.

The novel's secondary title is The Marvellous Adventures of Doctor Know-All.

Reception 

Grimm Reality won Best Book in the 2001 Jade Pagoda Awards.

References

External links
The Cloister Library - Grimm Reality

2001 British novels
2001 science fiction novels
Eighth Doctor Adventures
Novels by Simon Bucher-Jones
Novels by Kelly Hale
British science fiction novels